Isabelle Beckers (born 4 March 1983) is a Belgian professional racing cyclist, who currently rides for UCI Women's Continental Team . She finished third in the Belgian National Time Trial Championships in 2016, and second in 2017.

Major results

Road
2016
 3rd Time trial, National Championships
2017
 2nd Time trial, National Championships

See also
 List of 2015 UCI Women's Teams and riders

References

External links

1983 births
Living people
Belgian female cyclists
Place of birth missing (living people)